The Martyrologium Hieronymianum (meaning "martyrology of Jerome") or Martyrologium sancti Hieronymi   (meaning "martyrology of Saint Jerome") is an ancient martyrology or  list of Christian martyrs in calendar order, one of the most used and influential of the Middle Ages. It is the oldest surviving general or "universal" martyrology, and the precursor of all later Western martyrologies.

Pseudepigraphically attributed to Saint Jerome, the Martyrologium Hieronymianum contains a reference to him derived from the opening chapter of his Life of  Malchus (392 AD) where Jerome states his intention to write a history of the saints and martyrs from the apostolic times: "I decided to write [a history, mentioned earlier] from the coming of the savior up to our age, that is, from the apostles, up to the dregs of our time".

Date and textual history

The  Martyrologium Hieronymianum  appears to have drawn for its material on the existing calendar of Rome, on one from Africa, and on a compilation made in Greek around the year 362 A.D. and which used as a major source the details found regarding the martyrs in works of   Eusebius of Caesarea. The contents of the 362 AD compilation are  known to us from an untidy Syriac translation, the Martyrology of AD 411. It is the geographical  spread of the sources which  gave this pioneering martyrology its general or "universal" character. Nevertheless, on account precisely of this non-local character and because the date of final compilation considerable postdates the end of the main anti-Christian persecutions, the antiquity of much of the information gathered is undermined by the inevitable errors caused by multiple compilers and by scribes to whom the persons mentioned could not have been personally unknown. It appears that the initial Latin text was fabricated in Northern Italy,  probably within the Patriarchate of Aquileia, in the 430s or 440s, but then later  reworked in  Gaul, probably at Auxerre, about the year 600. It is from this line of transmission that the surviving manuscripts descend. 

The three earliest manuscripts which do  survive of the Latin Martyrologium Hieronymianum  as such are all relatively late, from the 8th century, which means they have inevitably suffered interference in the course of transmission. The oldest of them  comes from the monastery of the  Northumbrian missionary St Willibrord at Echternach and was written in England in the first years of the 8th century. Two other important manuscripts were written in the same century, one for the monastery of Saint Avoldus near Metz, and the other was copied by 772 AD for the monastery of Saint-Wandrille and then came to the monastery of St Peter in Wissembourg. 

In 1894 the text of the three manuscripts were juxtaposed in a publication contributed by  Giovanni Battista de Rossi and Louis Duchesne to the monumental Acta Sanctorum, which prepared the way for a critical edition published by Henri Quentin in 1931 along with a historical commentary by  the Bollandist Hippolyte Delehaye, again in connection with the  Acta Sanctorum, 

Scholars generally assume that in the lists of martyrs that head each day's entry, newer additions were added at the bottom of the lists, and thus the first names are most likely to be those from the lost earliest versions of the Martyrologium Hieronymianum.

Contents
The material preserved in the  Martyrologium Hieronymianum  is such that highly specialist training is needed to evaluate it. Derived as the material often is from calendars, it is no surprise that the greater part of the  entries contain only summary lists of names and places, for example:  "On the third day before the Ides of January, at Rome, in the [catacomb] cemetery of Callixtus, on the Appian Way, was buried Miltiades, the bishop".

The first "historical" martyrologies, (containing narrative history of the life of a saint), would not flower until the Carolingian period, starting with the martyrology of Bede.

See also

Martyrology of Usuard
Florus of Lyon
Ado of Vienne
Rabanus Maurus – Carolingian author of martyrologies
Notker Balbulus – Carolingian author of martyrologies

References

Further reading 
Giovanni Battista de Rossi and Louis Duchesne, editors, Martyrologium Hieronymianum in Acta Sanctorum LXXXII November, part II (1894)
Hippolyte Delehaye, Commentarius perpetuus in Martyrologium Hieronymianum ad recensionem H. Quentin in Acta Sanctorum XXIV November 11, part II]. (Brussels, 1931)
 Jacques Dubois, O.S.B., Les martyrologes du Moyen Âge latin 1978
Catholic Encyclopedia:"Martyrology", "Chair of Peter", "Sts. Quirinus", etc.
 Latin transcription and notes, in 
 McCulloh, John M. (1987). "Martyrology", Dictionary of the Middle Ages (vol.8)

Martyrologies
Latin pseudepigrapha
6th-century Latin books
6th-century Christian texts
Jerome